The following is a partial list of the "A" codes for Medical Subject Headings (MeSH), as defined by the United States National Library of Medicine (NLM).

This list continues the information at List of MeSH codes (A06). Codes following these are found at List of MeSH codes (A08). For other MeSH codes, see List of MeSH codes.

The source for this content is the set of 2006 MeSH Trees from the NLM.

– cardiovascular system

– blood-air barrier

– blood-aqueous barrier

– blood–brain barrier

– blood-nerve barrier

– blood-retinal barrier

– blood-testis barrier

– blood vessels

– arteries
  – aorta
  – aorta, abdominal
  – aorta, thoracic
  – sinus of valsalva
  – arterioles
  – axillary artery
  – basilar artery
  – brachial artery
  – brachiocephalic trunk
  – bronchial arteries
  – carotid arteries
  – carotid artery, common
  – carotid artery, external
  – carotid artery, internal
  – carotid sinus
  – celiac artery
  – cerebral arteries
  – anterior cerebral artery
  – circle of willis
  – middle cerebral artery
  – posterior cerebral artery
  – temporal arteries
  – ciliary arteries
  – coronary vessels
  – epigastric arteries
  – femoral artery
  – gastroepiploic artery
  – hepatic artery
  – iliac artery
  – maxillary artery
  – meningeal arteries
  – mesenteric arteries
  – mesenteric artery, inferior
  – mesenteric artery, superior
  – ophthalmic artery
  – popliteal artery
  – pulmonary artery
  – radial artery
  – renal artery
  – retinal artery
  – splenic artery
  – subclavian artery
  – thoracic arteries
  – mammary arteries
  – tibial arteries
  – ulnar artery
  – umbilical arteries
  – vertebral artery

– endothelium, vascular
  – pericytes
  – tunica intima

– microcirculation
  – arterioles
  – arteriovenous anastomosis
  – capillaries
  – venules

– muscle, smooth, vascular
  – tunica media

– retinal vessels
  – retinal artery
  – retinal vein

– tunica intima

– vasa nervorum

– vasa vasorum

– veins
  – axillary vein
  – azygos vein
  – brachiocephalic veins
  – cerebral veins
  – coronary vessels
  – cranial sinuses
  – cavernous sinus
  – femoral vein
  – hepatic veins
  – iliac vein
  – jugular veins
  – popliteal vein
  – portal system
  – mesenteric veins
  – portal vein
  – splenic vein
  – umbilical veins
  – pulmonary veins
  – renal veins
  – retinal vein
  – saphenous vein
  – subclavian vein
  – venae cavae
  – vena cava, inferior
  – vena cava, superior
  – venules

– heart

– endocardium

– fetal heart
  – ductus arteriosus
  – truncus arteriosus

– heart atria
  – atrial appendage

– heart conduction system
  – atrioventricular node
  – bundle of his
  – purkinje fibers
  – sinoatrial node

– heart septum

– heart valves
  – aortic valve
  – chordae tendineae
  – mitral valve
  – papillary muscles
  – pulmonary valve
  – tricuspid valve

– heart ventricles

– myocardium

– papillary muscles

– pericardium

The list continues at List of MeSH codes (A08).

A07